Marlon Williams may refer to:
Marley Marl (born 1962), American DJ and producer
Marlon Williams (athlete) (born 1956), Virgin Islands runner
Marlon Williams (guitarist), hip hop musician from Los Angeles
Marlon Williams (musician) (born 1990), New Zealand singer-songwriter and guitarist
Marlon Williams (album), 2016